Percy Benzie Abery (20 October 1876 – 20 January 1948) was a prominent Welsh photographer of the early to mid-20th century.

Abery was born in Sandgate, Kent. He came to prominence as a photographer in the Builth Wells area, where he settled in 1898 aged 21. From 1911 onwards his business was located in West End Studio, where a blue plaque commemorates the fact. Though located in Builth Wells, he covered large parts of Mid-Wales and was involved in press photography, publishing postcards as well as the stock in trade studio portraits and weddings. He was also appointed the official photographer by Birmingham Water Works to document the building of the Elan Valley Reservoirs.

Abery photographed many aspects of rural life, many of which photographs have now disappeared. He died on January 20, 1948, and his ashes were scattered in the sea off Aberystwyth.

Prior to his death in 1948 in Breconshire, he selected over a thousand of his glass negatives to be donated to the National Library of Wales in Aberystwyth.

References

Further reading
 

1876 births
1948 deaths
People from Builth Wells
Welsh photographers
Postcard publishers